George Alfred Lawrence (25 March 1827 – 23 September 1876) was a British novelist and barrister.

Biography
George Alfred Lawrence was born at Buxted, Sussex, the eldest child of Rev. Alfred Charnley Lawrence, Curate of Uxfield Chapel, Buxted, and the Hon. Lady Emily Mary Finch-Hatton, sister of George William Finch-Hatton, 5th Earl of Nottingham and 10th Earl of Winchilsea.

He was educated at Rugby and at Balliol College, Oxford, and in 1851 married Mary Ann Georgiana Kirwan. He was called to the bar at the Inner Temple in 1852, but soon abandoned the law for literature.

In 1857 he published anonymously a first novel, Guy Livingstone, "portraying a more violent picture of Rugby School than Thomas Hughes." This gained great popularity. He went on to write several more tales in what has been called the "muscular school" of novel-writing, introducing into English fiction a beau sabreur type of hero, great in sport and love and war. Sword and Gown (1859), for example, "is a bigamy story, climaxing in the Charge of the Light Brigade". The gentleman protagonist of Barren Honour. A Tale (1862) dies in a shipwreck. It has been called "a study of magnificently chivalrous self-destruction".

On the outbreak of the American Civil War Lawrence went to America with the intention of joining the Confederate Army. He was taken prisoner and only released on promising to return to England. He travelled much in later years and died in Edinburgh.

Writings
Other works include:
Sword and Gown (1859)
Barren honour (1862)
Blanche Ellerslie's ending
Border and bastille (1863)
Sans merci; or, Kestrels and falcons (1866)
Brakespeare; or The fortunes of a free lance (1868)
Breaking a butterfly (1869)
Silverland
Maurice Dering
Anteros

Notes

References

Attribution:

External links
 
 

19th-century English novelists
Victorian novelists
1827 births
1876 deaths
Alumni of Balliol College, Oxford
Place of birth missing
English male novelists
People from Buxted